Ernst Walter Mayr (5 July 1904 – 3 February 2005) was one of the 20th century's leading evolutionary biologists. He was also a renowned taxonomist, tropical explorer, ornithologist, philosopher of biology, and historian of science. His work contributed to the conceptual revolution that led to the modern evolutionary synthesis of Mendelian genetics, systematics, and Darwinian evolution, and to the development of the biological species concept.

Although Charles Darwin and others posited that multiple species could evolve from a single common ancestor, the mechanism by which this occurred was not understood, creating the species problem. Ernst Mayr approached the problem with a new definition for species. In his book Systematics and the Origin of Species (1942) he wrote that a species is not just a group of morphologically similar individuals, but a group that can breed only among themselves, excluding all others. When populations within a species become isolated by geography, feeding strategy, mate choice, or other means, they may start to differ from other populations through genetic drift and natural selection, and over time may evolve into new species. The most significant and rapid genetic reorganization occurs in extremely small populations that have been isolated (as on islands).

His theory of peripatric speciation (a more precise form of allopatric speciation which he advanced), based on his work on birds, is still considered a leading mode of speciation, and was the theoretical underpinning for the theory of punctuated equilibrium, proposed by Niles Eldredge and Stephen Jay Gould. Mayr is sometimes credited with inventing modern philosophy of biology, particularly the part related to evolutionary biology, which he distinguished from physics due to its introduction of (natural) history into science.

Biography

Mayr was the second son of Helene Pusinelli and Dr. Otto Mayr. His father was a jurist (District Prosecuting
Attorney at Würzburg) but took an interest in natural history and took the children out on field trips. He learnt all the local birds in Würzburg from his elder brother Otto. He also had access to a natural history magazine for amateurs, Kosmos. His father died just before he was thirteen. The family then moved to Dresden and he studied at the Staatsgymnasium ("Royal Gymnasium" until 1918) in Dresden-Neustadt and completed his high school education there. In April 1922, while still in high school, he joined the newly founded Saxony Ornithologists' Association. Here he met Rudolf Zimmermann, who became his ornithological mentor. In February 1923, Mayr passed his high school examination (Abitur) and his mother rewarded him with a pair of binoculars.

On 23 March 1923 on one of the lakes of Moritzburg, the Frauenteich, he spotted what he identified as a red-crested pochard. The species had not been seen in Saxony since 1845 and the local club argued about the identity. Raimund Schelcher (1891–1979) of the club then suggested that Mayr visit his classmate Erwin Stresemann on his way to Greifswald, where Mayr was to begin his medical studies. After a tough interrogation, Stresemann accepted and published the sighting as authentic. Stresemann was very impressed and suggested that, between semesters, Mayr could work as a volunteer in the ornithological section of the museum. Mayr wrote about this event, "It was as if someone had given me the key to heaven." He entered the University of Greifswald in 1923 and, according to Mayr himself, "took the medical curriculum (to satisfy a family tradition) but after only a year, he decided to leave medicine and enrolled at the Faculty of Biological Sciences." Mayr was endlessly interested in ornithology and "chose Greifswald at the Baltic for my studies for no other reason than that ... it was situated in the ornithologically most interesting area." Although he ostensibly planned to become a physician, he was "first and foremost an ornithologist." During the first semester break Stresemann gave him a test to identify treecreepers and Mayr was able to identify most of the specimens correctly. Stresemann declared that Mayr "was a born systematist". In 1925, Stresemann suggested that he give up his medical studies, in fact he should leave the faculty of medicine and enrol into the faculty of Biology and then join the Berlin Museum with the prospect of bird-collecting trips to the tropics, on the condition that he completed his doctoral studies in 16 months. Mayr completed his doctorate in ornithology at the University of Berlin under Dr. Carl Zimmer, who was a full professor (Ordentlicher Professor), on 24 June 1926 at the age of 21. On 1 July he accepted the position offered to him at the museum for a monthly salary of 330.54 Reichsmark.

At the International Zoological Congress at Budapest in 1927, Mayr was introduced by Stresemann to banker and naturalist Walter Rothschild, who asked him to undertake an expedition to New Guinea on behalf of himself and the American Museum of Natural History in New York. In New Guinea, Mayr collected several thousand bird skins (he named 26 new bird species during his lifetime) and, in the process also named 38 new orchid species. During his stay in New Guinea, he was invited to accompany the Whitney South Seas Expedition to the Solomon Islands. Also, while in New Guinea, he visited the Lutheran missionaries Otto Thiele and Christian Keyser, in the Finschhafen district; there, while in conversation with his hosts, he uncovered the discrepancies in Hermann Detzner's popular book Four Years among Cannibals: New Guinea, in which Detzner claimed to have seen the interior, discovered several species of flora and fauna, while remaining only steps ahead of the Australian patrols sent to capture him. He returned to Germany in 1930.

Mayr moved to the United States in 1931 to take up a curatorial position at the American Museum of Natural History, where he played the important role of brokering and acquiring the Walter Rothschild collection of bird skins, which was being sold in order to pay off a blackmailer. During his time at the museum he produced numerous publications on bird taxonomy, and in 1942 his first book Systematics and the Origin of Species, which completed the evolutionary synthesis started by Darwin.

After Mayr was appointed at the American Museum of Natural History, he influenced American ornithological research by mentoring young birdwatchers. Mayr was surprised at the differences between American and German birding societies. He noted that the German society was "far more scientific, far more interested in life histories and breeding bird species, as well as in reports on recent literature."

Mayr organized a monthly seminar under the auspices of the Linnean Society of New York. Under the influence of J.A. Allen, Frank Chapman, and Jonathan Dwight, the society concentrated on taxonomy and later became a clearing house for bird banding and sight records.

Mayr encouraged his Linnaean Society seminar participants to take up a specific research project of their own. Under Mayr's influence one of them, Joseph Hickey, went on to write A Guide to Birdwatching (1943). Hickey remembered later, "Mayr was our age and invited on all our field trips. The heckling of this German foreigner was tremendous, but he gave tit for tat, and any modern picture of Dr E. Mayr as a very formal person does not square with my memory of the 1930s. He held his own." A group of eight young birdwatchers from The Bronx later became the Bronx County Bird Club, led by Ludlow Griscom. "Everyone should have a problem" was the way one Bronx County Bird Club member recalled Mayr's refrain. Mayr said of his own involvement with the local birdwatchers: "In those early years in New York when I was a stranger in a big city, it was the companionship and later friendship which I was offered in the Linnean Society that was the most important thing in my life."

Mayr also greatly influenced the American ornithologist Margaret Morse Nice. Mayr encouraged her to correspond with European ornithologists and helped her in her landmark study on song sparrows. Nice wrote to Joseph Grinnell in 1932, trying to get foreign literature reviewed in the Condor: "Too many American ornithologists have despised the study of the living bird; the magazines and books that deal with the subject abound in careless statements, anthropomorphic interpretations, repetition of ancient errors, and sweeping conclusions from a pitiful array of facts.  ... in Europe the study of the living bird is taken seriously. We could learn a great deal from their writing." Mayr ensured that Nice could publish her two-volume Studies in the Life History of the Song Sparrow. He found her a publisher, and her book was reviewed by Aldo Leopold, Joseph Grinnell, and Jean Delacour. Nice dedicated her book to "My Friend Ernst Mayr."

Mayr joined the faculty of Harvard University in 1953, where he also served as director of the Museum of Comparative Zoology from 1961 to 1970. He retired in 1975 as emeritus professor of zoology, showered with honors. Following his retirement, he went on to publish more than 200 articles, in a variety of journals—more than some reputable scientists publish in their entire careers; 14 of his 25 books were published after he was 65. Even as a centenarian, he continued to write books. On his 100th birthday, he was interviewed by Scientific American magazine.

Mayr died on 3 February 2005 in his retirement home in Bedford, Massachusetts, after a short illness. He had married fellow German Margarete "Gretel" Simon in May 1935 (they had met at a party in Manhattan in 1932), and she assisted Mayr in some of his work.

Margarete died in 1990. He was survived by two daughters (Christa Menzel and Susanne Harrison), five grandchildren and 10 great-grandchildren.

The awards that Mayr received include the National Medal of Science, the Balzan Prize, the Sarton Medal of the History of Science Society, the International Prize for Biology, the Loye and Alden Miller Research Award, and the Lewis Thomas Prize for Writing about Science. In 1939 he was elected a Corresponding Member of the Royal Australasian Ornithologists Union. He was awarded the 1946 Leidy Award from the Academy of Natural Sciences of Philadelphia. He was awarded the Linnean Society of London's prestigious Darwin-Wallace Medal in 1958 and the Linnaean Society of New York's inaugural Eisenmann Medal in 1983. For his work, Animal Species and Evolution, he was awarded the Daniel Giraud Elliot Medal from the National Academy of Sciences in 1967. Mayr was elected a Foreign Member of the Royal Society (ForMemRS) in 1988. In 1995 he received the Benjamin Franklin Medal for Distinguished Achievement in the Sciences of the American Philosophical Society, of which he was already a member.
Mayr never won a Nobel Prize, but he noted that there is no prize for evolutionary biology and that Darwin would not have received one, either. (In fact, there is no Nobel Prize for biology.) Mayr did win a 1999 Crafoord Prize. It honors basic research in fields that do not qualify for Nobel Prizes and is administered by the same organization as the Nobel Prize. In 2001, Mayr received the Golden Plate Award of the American Academy of Achievement.

Mayr was co-author of six global reviews of bird species new to science (listed below).

Mayr said he was an atheist in regards to "the idea of a personal God" because "there is nothing that supports [it]".

Ideas
As a traditionally-trained biologist, Mayr was often highly critical of early mathematical approaches to evolution, such as those of J.B.S. Haldane, and famously called such approaches "beanbag genetics" in 1959. He maintained that factors such as reproductive isolation had to be taken into account. In a similar fashion, Mayr was also quite critical of molecular evolution studies such as those of Carl Woese. Current molecular studies in evolution and speciation indicate that although allopatric speciation is the norm, there are numerous cases of sympatric speciation in groups with greater mobility, such as birds. The precise mechanisms of sympatric speciation, however, are usually a form of microallopatry enabled by variations in niche occupancy among individuals within a population.

In many of his writings, Mayr rejected reductionism in evolutionary biology, arguing that evolutionary pressures act on the whole organism, not on single genes, and that genes can have different effects depending on the other genes present. He advocated a study of the whole genome, rather than of only isolated genes. After articulating the biological species concept in 1942, Mayr played a central role in the species problem debate over what was the best species concept. He staunchly defended the biological species concept against the many definitions of "species" that others proposed.

Mayr was an outspoken defender of the scientific method and was known to critique sharply science on the edge. As a notable example, in 1995, he criticized the Search for Extra-Terrestrial Intelligence (SETI), as conducted by fellow Harvard professor Paul Horowitz, as being a waste of university and student resources for its inability to address and answer a scientific question. Over 60 eminent scientists, led by Carl Sagan, rebutted the criticism.

Mayr rejected the idea of a gene-centered view of evolution and starkly but politely criticised Richard Dawkins's ideas:

Mayr insisted that the entire genome should be considered as the target of selection, rather than individual genes:

Currently recognised taxa named in his honour

 Bismarck black myzomela (Myzomela psammelaena ernstmayri) Meise, 1929 - a subspecies of bird, a honeyeater, family Meliphagidae, confined to several small islands to the west of the Admiralty Islands, in western Oceania, northeast of New Guinea.
 Mayr's forest rail (Rallicula mayri) (Hartert, 1930) - a species of bird found in New Guinea.
 Mayr's honeyeater (Ptiloprora mayri) Hartert, 1930 - a species of bird found in New Guinea.
 Mayr's swiftlet (Aerodramus orientalis) (Mayr, 1935) - a species of bird found in New Ireland and Guadalcanal.
 Ernst Mayr's water rat (Leptomys ernstmayri) Rümmler, 1932   - a species of rodent, of the family Muridae, from the Foja Mountains of Papua Province, Indonesia, and Central Cordillera, Adelbert Range, and Huon Peninsula of  Papua New Guinea.
 a roundworm - Poikilolaimus ernstmayri Sudhaus & Koch, 2004   - a new species of nematode, family Rhabditidae, associated with termites of the genus Reticulitermes, on Corsica.
 New Ireland rail (Gallirallus ernstmayri) † (Kirchman & Steadman, 2006)   - a relatively large, probably flightless, extinct rail, family Rallidae, known from subfossil remains found on prehistoric archeological sites, in caves on New Ireland, in the Bismarck Archipelago, western Oceania.)
 Star Mountains worm-eating snake (Toxicocalamus ernstmayri) O'Shea, Parker & Kaiser, 2015   - a 1.2 m, rare and secretive, venomous snake from the family Elapidae, believed to feed exclusively of earthworms, particularly the giant earthworms of the Megascolecidae. The etymology reads: The species name ernstmayri is a patronym honoring the German-American ornithologist, systematist, and evolutionary thinker Ernst Mayr (1904–2005). There are several connections linking Ernst Mayr to this new species of Toxicocalamus, which make him, and this snake, the ideal candidates for a patronym. First, Mayr himself visited New Guinea, and during the late 1920s he spent over 2 years conducting fieldwork in an area now part of PNG, as a member of a joint Rothschild–AMNH expedition focusing on birds of paradise (Aves, Passeriformes, Paradisaeidae), during which he collected many new bird and orchid species. Second, the holotype of T. ernstmayri has been housed in the MCZ collection, mislabeled as Micropechis ikaheka, after having arrived and been accessioned in June 1975, the month and year that Mayr retired. Third, the true identity of this specimen was recognized by one of us (MOS) during a visit to the MCZ in May 2014, undertaken with the financial support of an Ernst Mayr Travel Grant from Harvard University, awarded to enable examination of the Toxicocalamus holdings at the MCZ and the AMNH, the two U.S. institutions where Mayr worked. Finally, 2015, the publication year of this description, marks the decennial of Mayr's passing at age 100, and naming a New Guinea snake after him seems a suitable tribute.
 an assassin bug - Bagauda ernstmayri Kulkarni & Ghate, 2016   - a species of cavernicolous, thread-legged assassin bug, known only from Satara, in the Western Ghats of Maharashtra State, India.
 a genus of pseudoscorpions - Ernstmayria Curcic et al., 2006
 a species of spider - Cebrennus mayri Jäger, 2000
 a species of damselfly - Palaiargia ernstmayri Lieftinck, 1972
 a species of bird lice - Anaticola ernstmayri Eichler, 1954
 a species of earwig - Irdex ernstmayri Günther, 1930

Summary of Darwin's theory

Darwin's theory of evolution is based on key facts and the inferences drawn from them, which Mayr summarised as follows:

 Every species is fertile enough that if all offspring survived to reproduce, the population would grow (fact).
 Despite periodic fluctuations, populations remain roughly the same size (fact).
 Resources such as food are limited and are relatively stable over time (fact).
 Struggle for survival ensues (inference).
 Individuals in a population vary significantly from one another (fact).
 Much of the variation is heritable (fact).
 Individuals less suited to the environment are less likely to survive and less likely to reproduce; individuals more suited to the environment are more likely to survive and more likely to reproduce and leave their heritable traits to future generations, which produces the process of natural selection (fact).
 This slowly effected process results in populations changing to adapt to their environments, and ultimately, these variations accumulate over time to form new species (inference).

In relation to the publication of Darwin's Origins of Species, Mayr identified philosophical implications of evolution:
 Evolving world, not a static one.
 Implausibility of creationism.
 Refutation that the universe has purpose.
 Defeating the justifications for a human-centric world.
 Materialistic processes explain the impression of design.
 Population thinking replaces essentialism.

Bibliography

Books
 
 
 
 
 
 Mayr, Ernst. & William B. Provine,  (eds) (1980). The Evolutionary Synthesis: Perspectives on the Unification of Biology,

Global reviews of species new to science

Other notable publications
1923 "Die Kolbenente (Nyroca rufina) auf dem Durchzuge in Sachsen". Ornithologische Monatsberichte 31:135–136
1923 "Der Zwergfliegenschnäpper bei Greifswald". Ornithologische Monatsberichte 31:136
1926 "Die Ausbreitung des Girlitz (Serinus canaria serinus L.) Ein Beitrag zur Tiergeographie". J. für Ornithologie 74:571–671
1927 "Die Schneefinken (Gattungen Montifringilla und Leucosticte)" J. für Ornithologie 75:596–619
1929 with W Meise. Zeitschriftenverzeichnis des Museums für Naturkunde Mitteilungen aus dem Zoologischen Museum in Berlin 14:1–187
1930 (by Ernst Hartert) "List of birds collected by Ernst Mayr". Ornithologische Monatsberichte 36:27–128
1930 "My Dutch New Guinea Expedition". 1928. Ornithologische Monatsberichte 36:20–26
1931 Die Vögel des Saruwaged und Herzoggebirges (NO Neuginea) Mitteilungen aus dem Zoologischen Museum in Berlin 17:639–723
1931 "Birds collected during the Whitney South Sea Expedition. XII Notes on Halcyon chloris and some of its subspecies". American Museum Novitates no 469
1932 "A tenderfoot explorer in New Guinea" Natural History 32:83–97
1935 "Bernard Altum and the territory theory". Proceedings of the Linnaean Society of New York 45, 46:24–38 
1938 Birds of the Crane Pacific expedition, Ernst Mayr and Sidney Camras, Zoological Series of the Field Museum of Natural History, Volume XX, No. 34. 
1940 "Speciation phenomena in birds". American Naturalist 74:249–278
1941 "Borders and subdivision of the Polynesian region as based on our knowledge of the distribution of birds". Proceedings of the 6th Pacific Scientific Congress 4:191–195
1941 "The origin and history of the bird fauna of Polynesia". Proceedings of the 6th Pacific Scientific Congress 4:197–216
1943 "A journey to the Solomons". Natural History 52:30–37,48
1944 "Wallace's Line in the light of recent zoogeographics studies". Quarterly Review of Biology 19:1–14
1944 "The birds of Timor and Sumba". Bulletin of the American Museum of Natural History 83:123–194
1944 "Timor and the colonization of Australia by birds". Emu 44:113–130
1946 "History of the North American bird fauna" Wilson Bulletin 58:3–41
1946 "The naturalist in Leidy's time and today". Proceedings of the Academy of Natural Sciences of Philadelphia 98:271–276
1947 "Ecological factors in speciation". Evolution 1:263–288
1948 "The new Sanford Hall". Natural History 57:248–254
1950 The role of the antennae in the mating behavior of female Drosophila. Evolution 4:149–154
1951 Introduction and Conclusion. Pages 85,255–258 in The problem of land connections across the South Atlantic with special reference to the Mesozoic. Bulletin of the American Museum of Natural History 99:79–258
1951 with Dean Amadon, "A classification of recent birds". American Museum Novitates no. 1496
1953 with E G Linsley and R L Usinger. Methods and Principles of Systematica Zoology. McGraw-Hill, New York.
1954 "Changes in genetic environment and evolution". Pages 157–180 in Evolution as a Process (J Huxley, A C Hardy and E B Ford Eds) Allen and Unwin. London
1955 "Karl Jordan's contribution to current concepts in systematics and evolution". Transactions of the Royal Entomological Society of London 107:45–66
1956 with C B Rosen. "Geographic variation and hybridization in populations of Bahama snails (Cerion)". American Museum Novitates no 1806.
1957 "Species concepts and definitions". Pages 371–388 in The Species Problem (E. Mayr ed). AAAS, Washington DC.
1959 "The emergence of evolutionary novelties". Pages 349–380 in The Evolution of Life: Evolution after Darwin, vol 1 (S. Tax, ed) University of Chicago.
1959 "Darwin and the evolutionary theory in Biology". Pages 1–10 in Evolution and Anthropology: A Centennial Appraisal (B J Meggers, Ed) The Anthropological Society of Washington, Washington DC.
1959 "Agassiz, Darwin, and Evolution". Harvard Library Bulletin. 13:165–194
1961 "Cause and effect in biology: Kinds of causes, predictability, and teleology are viewed by a practicing biologist". Science 134:1501–1506
1962 "Accident or design: The paradox of evolution". Pages 1–14 in The Evolution of Living Organisms (G W Leeper, Ed) Melbourne University Press.
1964 Introduction, Bibliography and Subject Pages vii–xxviii, 491–513 in On the Origin of Species by Means of Natural Selection, or the Preservation of Favoured Races in the Struggle for Life, by Charles Darwin. A Facsimile of the First Edition. Harvard University Press.
1965 Comments. In Proceedings of the Boston Colloguium for the Philosophy of Science, 1962–1964. Boston Studies in the Philosophy of Science 2:151–156
1969 Discussion: Footnotes on the philosophy of biology. Philosophy of Science 36:197–202
1972 Continental drift and the history of the Australian bird fauna. Emu 72:26–28
1972 Geography and ecology as faunal determinants. Pages 549–561 in Proceedings XVth International Ornithological Congress (K H Voous, Ed) E J Brill, Leiden, The Netherlands.
1972 Lamarck revisited. Journal of the History of Biology. 5:55–94
1974 Teleological and teleonomic: A new analysis. Boston studies in the Philosophy of Science 14:91–117
1978 Tenure: A sacred cow? Science 199:1293
1980 How I became a Darwinian, Pages 413–423 in The Evolutionary Synthesis (E Mayr and W Provine, Eds) Harvard University Press, Cambridge, Massachusetts.
1980 with W B Provine, Eds. The Evolutionary Synthesis. Harvard University Press.
1981 Evolutionary biology. Pages 147–162 in The Joys of Research (W. Shripshire Jr, Ed.) Smithsonian Institution Press.
1984 Evolution and ethics. Pages 35–46 in Darwin, Mars and Freud: Their influence on Moral Theory (A L Caplan and B Jennings, Eds.) Plenum Press, New York.
1985. Darwin's five theories of evolution. In D. Kohn, ed., The Darwinian Heritage, Princeton NJ: Princeton University Press, pp. 755–772.
1985. How biology differs from the physical sciences. In D. J. Depew and B H Weber, eds., Evolution at a Crossroads: The New Biology and the New Philosophy of Science, Cambridge MA: The MIT Press, pp. 43–63.
1988. The why and how of species. Biology and Philosophy 3:431–441
1992. The idea of teleology. Journal of the History of Ideas 53:117–135
1994. with W.J. Bock. Provisional classifications v. standard avian sequences: heuristics and communication in ornithology. Ibis 136:12–18
1996. What is a species, and what is not? Philosophy of Science 63 (June): 262–277.
1996. The autonomy of biology: the position of biology among the sciences. Quarterly Review of Biology 71:97–106
1997. The objects of selection  Proc. Natl. Acad. Sci. USA 94 (March): 2091–94.
1999. Darwin's influence on modern thought Crafoord Prize lecture, September 23, 1999.
2000. Biology in the Twenty-First Century  Bioscience 50 (Oct. 2000): 895–897.
2001. 
2002. with Walter J Bock. Classifications and other ordering systems. Zeitschrift Zool. Syst. Evolut-Forsch. 40:1–25

See also
 American philosophy
 Biosemiotics
 Evolution
 List of American philosophers
 List of centenarians (scientists and mathematicians)
 Species Problem
 Philosophy of biology
 Proximate and ultimate causation

References

Citations

Sources 
 Works cited

 
  Reprint of 1980 edition (Mayr and William B. Provine, eds.) with new preface.

Further reading

External links

Ernst Mayr Biography and Interview on American Academy of Achievement
Ernst Mayr telling his life story at Web of Stories
"80 Years of Watching the Evolutionary Scenery" – by Ernst Mayr, Science.
Mayr on Eldredge and Gould's punctuated equilibria .
Ernst Mayr obituary in the Times
Ernst Mayr obituary in the Economist
Ernst Mayr and the Evolutionary Synthesis

Interview

1904 births
2005 deaths
People from Kempten im Allgäu
People from the Kingdom of Bavaria
German emigrants to the United States
American people of German descent
American atheists
American ornithologists
20th-century American philosophers
American science writers
Charles Darwin biographers
Critics of creationism
Critics of Lamarckism
Evolutionary biologists
Foreign Members of the Royal Society
German atheists
20th-century German biologists
German centenarians
German ornithologists
Harvard University faculty
Historians of science
History of evolutionary biology
Members of the French Academy of Sciences
Members of the United States National Academy of Sciences
Modern synthesis (20th century)
National Medal of Science laureates
People associated with the American Museum of Natural History
People from Bedford, Massachusetts
Scientists active at the Museum für Naturkunde, Berlin
University of Greifswald alumni
American centenarians
20th-century German zoologists
Men centenarians
Scientists from Dresden
Members of the American Philosophical Society